Liptena fontainei is a butterfly in the family Lycaenidae. It is found in the Democratic Republic of the Congo (Uele).

References

Butterflies described in 1974
Liptena
Endemic fauna of the Democratic Republic of the Congo
Butterflies of Africa